California High School (commonly referred to as Cal High) is one of two public high schools located in San Ramon, California, United States (Dougherty Valley High School is the other). It is one of four high schools in the San Ramon Valley Unified School District and serves students from the western portion of San Ramon and the unincorporated area of Norris Canyon. Its mascot is the grizzly bear.

As of the 2014–15 school year, the school had an enrollment of 2,639 students and 107.5 classroom teachers (on an FTE basis), for a student–teacher ratio of 24.5:1. There were 78 students (3.0% of enrollment) eligible for free lunch and 39 (1.5% of students) eligible for reduced-cost lunch.

Cal High's athletic rivals are Monte Vista High School and San Ramon Valley High School in Danville, and De La Salle High School in Concord.

Campus
Cal has an all-weather track and an aquatic center, including a multi-use athletic stadium and fields (football, soccer, lacrosse, and track and field). Outside, there are six tennis courts, four baseball/softball fields including one baseball field and one softball field intended for games, and an indoor gym and stadium. In 2004, a two-story, ten-classroom building was completed and was designated the World Language building. In 2006, the school added a new main building (67 classrooms on 3 stories) and a new library. In 2007, the school completed a new careers and technology building, student quad, and counseling building. In 2008, the new fine arts building was completed. In March 2010, a second gymnasium was completed on the site of outdoor basketball courts, called the Event Center. In April 2010, a new theater, which was under renovation for three years, opened. It has nine classrooms and is fully fitted with a video production studio and sound room, and an art gallery to display student work. Cal high has a large student and faculty parking area, though demand exceeds available space. In light of this, many of the streets around the school are permit parking zones. Cal High also has a recently renovated weight room, equipped with lifting machines and 12 fully stocked Olympic weightlifting cages used mainly by the football team and weightlifting class. Twelve years of construction were concluded with the installation of SunPower solar panels over the back parking lot in the summer of 2011.

Schedule
Unlike other schools in the district, Cal High operates on a block schedule. Classes are 100 minutes long, with the exception of Wednesday, when classes are 90 minutes long. The base schedule consists of six 100-minute periods; students have three classes per school day. Odd-numbered classes are on one day and even numbered classes the next. Some students opt to add an extra 50-minute "B-period" class to their schedule. B-period classes meet on Monday, Tuesday, Thursday and Friday for 59 minutes At the end of the second full period of the day, from 8:30 to 10:10, students have a designated "tutorial" period during which they can read, study, collaborate on work, or get help from teachers. There is no tutorial on Wednesday, since the day is shorter.

Awards and recognition
During the 2006–07 school year, California High School was recognized with the Blue Ribbon School Award of Excellence by the United States Department of Education, the highest award an American school can receive.

Cal High's student-run monthly newspaper is The Californian. The first school newspaper, The Bear Facts, was started in 1973.

California High School was ranked No. 250 in the top 500 US high schools by Newsweek in 2011, placing it within the top 1.5% of the over 18,000 high schools in the United States. In 2005, Cal High was a California Distinguished School.

In 2020, the California High School National History Bowl Team won 2nd place. They subsequently won 4th place in 2021.

Notable people

Alumni 

David Bingham (2008) – Major League Soccer player for San Jose Earthquakes
 Colby Buzzell (1995) – Author of multiple books and well-distributed magazine articles
 Chuck Cary (1978) Professional baseball player
 David Klech (2006) American track and field athlete
 Sandy LaBeaux (1978) – professional football player for the Tampa Bay Buccaneers and Houston Gamblers
Chris Verhulst (1984) – NFL Professional Football Player Houston Oilers (1988–1989), Denver Broncos (1990)
 Andrew Wiedeman (2007) – professional soccer player
 Ryan Wright (2018) – NFL Professional Football player, punter
 Sam Shapira (2010) - Dropout

Faculty 
Tony Sanchez – Head football coach from 2004 to 2008. Went on to coach the Bishop Gorman High School (Nevada) and University of Nevada, Las Vegas football programs. Sanchez turned around California High "from doormat status to a berth in the North Coast Section finals," according to ESPN.

Gallery

References

External links

Cal High website

High schools in Contra Costa County, California
Public high schools in California
San Ramon, California
Educational institutions established in 1973
1973 establishments in California